A DNA analyzer is a device used to determine characteristics of a person's DNA. For example, Genetic fingerprinting can be conducted with a portable DNA analyzer.

References 

DNA